Kathleen Mary Drew-Baker (6 November 1901 – 14 September 1957) was a British phycologist, known for her research on the edible seaweed Porphyra laciniata (nori), which led to a breakthrough for commercial cultivation.

Kathleen Drew-Baker's scientific legacy is revered in Japan, where she has been named Mother of the Sea. Her work is celebrated each year on April 14. A monument to her was erected in 1963 at the Sumiyoshi shrine in Uto, Kumamoto, Japan.

Early life and education
Born Kathleen Mary Drew on 6 November 1901 in Leigh, Lancashire, the elder daughter of Walter and Augusta Caroline Drew. She attended Bishop Wordsworth's School, Salisbury and won a County Major Scholarship to study botany at the University of Manchester. She graduated in 1922 with first class honours (one of the first two women to achieve a first class honours degree there) and subsequently studied for an MSc, graduating in 1923. In 1939 she was awarded a DSc (higher doctorate) from the same institution.

Academic career

Drew-Baker spent most of her academic life at the cryptogamic botany department of the University of Manchester, serving as a lecturer in Botany and Researcher from 1922 to 1957. In 1925 she spent two years working at the University of California, Berkeley after winning a Commonwealth Fellowship, travelling as far as Hawaii to collect botanical samples. Kathleen married Manchester academic Henry Wright-Baker in 1928, which resulted in her dismissal by the university which had a policy of not employing married women. Drew-Baker was awarded an Ashburne Hall Research Scholarship in 1922, and in later years joining the staff of the Manchester Botany Department and being awarded a research fellowship in the university's Laboratory of Cryptogamic Botany.

Research supporting commercial seaweed cultivation
Although Drew-Baker never travelled to Japan, her academic research made a lasting contribution to the development of commercial nori production in the country. Drew-Baker studied the life cycle of the red algae Porphyra umbilicalis and in an academic paper published in Nature in 1949, Drew-Baker detailed her research showing that the microscopic Conchocelis — hitherto thought of as an independent alga — was the diploid stage of the organism of which Porphyra is the macroscopic, haploid stage. Her critical discovery was that at the microscopic conchocelis stage, bivalves and bivalve shells provided an essential host environment for the development of the red algae.

Drew-Baker's investigations were soon read and replicated by the Japanese phycologist Sokichi Segawa, who applied Drew-Baker's findings to the Japanese nori seaweed, widely known for its use in sushi and other staples of Japanese cuisine. Although nori had been commercially harvested in Japan since the 17th century, it had always suffered from unpredictable harvests and had been particularly prone to damage from typhoons and pollution in coastal waters. By 1953, Fusao Ota and other Japanese marine biologists had developed artificial seeding techniques, building on her work. This in turn increased production and led to a significant increase in production in the Japanese seaweed industry.

In honour of her contributions to the Japanese aquaculture and role in rescuing the commercial production of nori, she was named Mother of the Sea in Japan, and since 1953, an annual "Drew festival" is celebrated in the city of Uto, Kumamoto in Japan, where a shrine to her was also erected.

Between 1924 and 1947 Drew-Baker published 47 academic papers mainly concerned with red algae. Her book A Revision of the Genera Chantransia, Rhodochorton, and Acrohaetium. With descriptions of the marine species of Rhodochorton, Naeg., Gen. Emend. on the Pacific Coast of North America was published by the University of California Press, Berkeley, in 1928.

She was a co-founder of the British Phycological Society in 1952 with her friend and fellow phycologist Margaret T. Martin and its first elected president.

Family
She married Professor Henry Wright-Baker of the Manchester College of Science and Technology in 1928, and they had two children, John Rendle and K. Frances Biggs. She was a member of the Society of Friends.

Author abbreviation

References

External links 
Portrait photograph
Uto City official webpage (in Japanese, archived at the Internet Archive)
 BBC Radio 4 Program The Mother of The Sea
 Finding Nori — How an unpaid UK researcher saved the Japanese seaweed industry

British phycologists
Women phycologists
Academics of the Victoria University of Manchester
1901 births
1957 deaths
People from Leigh, Greater Manchester
People educated at Bishop Wordsworth's School
Women botanists
20th-century British botanists
20th-century British women scientists